Ocotea porosa, commonly called imbuia or Brazilian walnut, is a species of plant in the Lauraceae family. Its wood is very hard, and it is a major commercial timber species in Brazil.

Taxonomy and naming
It is often placed in the related genus, Phoebe. It is commonly called imbuia, and is also known as Brazilian walnut, because its wood resembles that of some walnuts (to which it is not related).

Portuguese common names (with variant spellings) include embuia, embúia, embuya, imbuia, imbúia, imbuya, canela-imbuia.

Habitat
The tree grows naturally in the subtropical montane Araucaria forests of southern Brazil, mostly in the states of Paraná and Santa Catarina (where it is the official state tree since 1973), and in smaller numbers in São Paulo and Rio Grande do Sul. The species may also occur in adjacent Argentina and/or Paraguay.

In its native habitat it is a threatened species.

Description

The wood is very hard, measuring 3,684 lbf (16,390 N) on the Janka scale. The wood is also fragrant with hints of nutmeg and cinnamon (also a member of the Lauraceae).

Uses
The tree is a major commercial timber species in Brazil, used for high-end furniture, mostly as decorative veneers, and as flooring. 

The tree is also a popular horticultural tree in subtropical regions of the world.

References

porosa
Endemic flora of Brazil
Trees of Brazil
Flora of Paraná (state)
Flora of Rio de Janeiro (state)
Flora of Rio Grande do Sul
Flora of Santa Catarina (state)
Flora of São Paulo (state)
Trees of mild maritime climate
Vulnerable flora of South America
Garden plants of South America
Ornamental trees
Taxonomy articles created by Polbot